Ang sa Iyo ay Akin (International title: The Law of Revenge / ) is a 2020 Philippine drama series broadcast by Kapamilya Channel. Directed by FM Reyes, it stars Jodi Sta. Maria, Iza Calzado and Sam Milby. The series was aired on the network's Primetime Bida evening block and worldwide via The Filipino Channel from August 17, 2020 to March 19, 2021, replacing Make It with You on its previous timeslot, replacing The World of a Married Couple, it was replaced by Huwag Kang Mangamba.

The series is streaming online on Netflix.

Premise
Ellice is the beloved daughter of a successful businessman who is blessed to live a luxury life, while Marissa enjoys a simple life with her mother working and living at Villa Ceñidoza. Despite the vast difference in their social statuses, the two women become inseparable best friends. However, one fateful night changes the course of their lives forever, which will ruin their friendship and become sworn rivals.

Cast and characters

Main cast
 Jodi Sta. Maria as Marissa Pineda-Mansueto
 Iza Calzado as Ellice Ceñidoza-Villarosa
 Sam Milby as Gabriel Villarosa

Supporting cast
 Maricel Soriano as Lucinda "Lucing" Dela Cruz-Pineda
 Desiree del Valle as Sonya Villarosa-Escobar
 Simon Ibarra as Caesar Augusto
 Carla Martinez as Adelina Guevarra
 Cheska Iñigo as Carmelita Villarosa
 Nico Antonio as Blue Baltazar
 Jimi Marquez as Protacio "Pinky" Chavez
 Brenda Mage as Resituto "Tutti" Villas
 Tart Carlos as Chona Canlas
 Jef Gaitan as Cristina Villarosa
 Jenny Jamora as Helena Villarosa-Asistio
 Manuel Chua as Jared "Red" Adonis
 Aya Fernandez as Agatha Cortez
 Ced Torrecarion as Enzo Escobar
 Alvin Anson as Ramon Villarosa (Season 1)
 Paulo Angeles as Angelo "Gelo" Marasigan (Season 1)
 Michelle Vito as Heidi V. Escobar (Season 1)
 Grae Fernandez as Jake P. Zulyani  (Season 2)
 Kira Balinger as Hope C. Villarosa (Season 2)
 Joseph Marco as Avelino "Avel" Mansueto Jr. (Season 2)
 Rita Avila as Belen Ceñidoza (Season 2)
 Poppert Bernadas as Silverio "Rio" Tan (Season 2)
 Karl Gabriel as RJ Villa (Season 2)
 Amy Nobleza as Charity Faith Santos (Season 2)
 L.A Santos as Alfred Vega (Season 2)

Guest cast
 Lito Pimentel as Jorge Ceñidoza
 Albie Casiño as Victor Montelibano
 Allan Paule as Nestor Pineda
 Johnny Revilla as Cong. Joaquin Montelibano
 Loren Burgos as Meredith Bautista
 Alain Villafuerte as Andres Franca
 Thou Reyes as Ruben Madriaga
 Joem Bascon as Francis Angeles
 Olive Isidro Cruz as Lestari Zulyani
 Caroline Garcia as Minju Gonzales
 Raul Montesa as Lamberto "Ambo" Fernandez
 Cherrylyn David as Rina Fernandez
 Aurora Yumul as Aurelia "Auring" Villana
 Zaijian Jaranilla as Jacob P. Villarosa

Production
The project was first unveiled in January 2020 with a working title What Matters Most. The full trailer was released on March 11, 2020, on ABS-CBN, with the final title confirmed as Ang sa Iyo ay Akin.

The series was also filmed on ABS-CBN Soundstage (Horizon IT Park) located at San Jose del Monte, Bulacan.

Broadcast
Ang sa Iyo ay Akin was scheduled to premiere on March 23, 2020, as part of ABS-CBN's Kapamilya Gold afternoon block, originally to replace Sandugo. It was postponed due to the lockdown caused by the COVID-19 pandemic, with its intended timeslot filled by a re-run of Got to Believe. However, ABS-CBN went off-the-air on May 5, 2020, due to a cease-and-desist order issued on account of it's franchise expiration.

A month after the denial of ABS-CBN's franchise renewal, it was announced that the series would air instead on pay cable and satellite via Kapamilya Channel, premiering on August 17, 2020, as part of the network's Primetime Bida evening block, replacing the cancelled drama Make It with You and the complete series of The World of a Married Couple. In October 2020, the series began its broadcast on free-to-air television through ZOE Broadcasting Network's A2Z Channel 11 and later on TV5 from March 8 until March 19, 2021 as part of Todo Max Primetime (renamed Todo Max Primetime Singko).

COVID-19 pandemic
During the enhanced community quarantine in Luzon, Iza Calzado was reported to be hospitalized on March 25, 2020, due to pneumonia and tested for COVID-19. Three days later, she was confirmed to have afflicted with the virus disease. After another test, Calzado tested negative for COVID-19 and was discharged from the hospital on March 30, 2020.

Accolades

Reruns
Ang Sa Iyo ay Akin re-aired on Kapamilya Channel's Kapamilya Gold afternoon block, Kapamilya Online Live and A2Z on November 28, 2022  replacing the re-run of Bagani.

See also
List of programs broadcast by Kapamilya Channel
List of programs broadcast by A2Z (Philippine TV channel)
List of programs broadcast by TV5 (Philippine TV network)
List of programs broadcast by ABS-CBN
List of programs broadcast by Jeepney TV
List of ABS-CBN drama series

References

Notes

External links

ABS-CBN drama series
Philippine melodrama television series
Philippine romance television series
Television series about revenge
2020 Philippine television series debuts
2021 Philippine television series endings
Filipino-language television shows
Television shows set in the Philippines
Television productions postponed due to the COVID-19 pandemic